Pseudosporochnales is an order of the extinct cladoxylopsids.  It contains the Hyeniales.

References

Prehistoric plant orders
Fern orders